Nezamshahr (also Romanized as Nez̧āmshahr, Naz̧mshahr, Nizāmshahr; formerly, Nezamabad (Persian: نظام آباد) also Romanized as Nez̧āmābād, Naz̧mābād, Nizāmābād) is a city in and capital of Rud Ab District, in Narmashir County, Kerman Province, Iran.  At the 2006 census, its population was 1,757, in 465 families.

References

Populated places in Narmashir County

Cities in Kerman Province